Zadashm is king of Turan in Ferdowsi's Shahnameh. He is son Tur, grandson of Fereydun, father of Pashang and grandfather of Afrasiab. Nothing is known about his life and reign.

References 
Shahnameh characters